Ole Andreas Furu (26 December 1841 – 28 November 1925) was a Norwegian lawyer, civil servant and politician.

Furu was born in Trondheim, Norway, the son of Andreas Olsen Furu (1813–1887) and Karen Olsdatter Lien. He grew up on a farm in Sunndal and earned his law degree in 1867.

He was a member of the Parliament of Norway from 1880 to 1882 and from 1886 to 1888, representing the Conservative Party. He joined Stang's First Cabinet in 1890, first as member of the Council of State Division in Stockholm, later as Minister of the Interior. He was a member Stang's Second Cabinet, where he served as Minister of Auditing, and later Minister of Finance and Customs. He was County Governor of Akershus from 1895 to 1918.

References

1841 births
1925 deaths
People from Trondheim
Members of the Storting
Politicians from Trondheim
Conservative Party (Norway) politicians
Government ministers of Norway
County governors of Norway
Commanders of the Order of the Polar Star
Ministers of Finance of Norway
People from Sunndal